The Third World War: The Untold Story (1982) is a war novel by Sir John
 Hackett portraying a fictional Third World War between NATO and the Warsaw Pact forces, which breaks out in 1985. It is written in the style of a non-fiction, post-event historical account. It was published in 1982 by Macmillan in New York and Sidgwick & Jackson in London. The book is an update to Hackett's 1978 novel, The Third World War: August 1985.

In The Third World War: The Untold Story, Hackett incorporates geopolitical and technological developments that took place during and after he wrote his first book on this theme. In this update to his 1978 novel, Hackett introduces historic events, including the rise of Solidarity in Poland and the 1979 Sino-Vietnamese War. New plot threads include material based on the proposed militarization of space and the eventual participation of Ireland and Sweden in the war. In addition, Hackett goes into more detail on Soviet planning and doctrine.

The events of the late 1980s, culminating with the collapse of the Soviet Union without war and German Unification, have made it impossible for the scenario depicted in book to ever happen – making it an example of retrofuturism.

Plot

Setting
In 1984, Democratic Party nominee Walter Mondale loses a divisive presidential election to a relatively unknown conservative Republican, the fictitious Governor Thompson of South Carolina. After Thompson takes office, his political and diplomatic advisors draft a report on the increasing complexities of the international geopolitical situation, which will assist the new president in shaping foreign policy direction. The People's Republic of China is becoming the premier economic power in Asia, bolstered by various strategic partnerships with Japanese industry. Various other Asian countries are also performing well as their economies are buoyed by China's recent successes, save for India, which is disintegrating as a political union and devolving into smaller coalitions of mutually hostile proto-states. Egypt's longstanding regime has just been ousted and replaced by an unstable left-wing government, intensifying the Arab Cold War through its bitter rivalry with Saudi Arabia. South Africa has become a federation under the bantustan system but is increasingly threatened by Nigeria, which has committed troops to the South African Border War.

The Soviet sphere of influence is rapidly shrinking, as most of India's larger and wealthier states have declared themselves allies of the US, and North Korea and Vietnam have followed China's lead in liberalizing their economies, which has made them vital partners in the Sino-Japanese trade alliance and considerably less disposed towards Soviet overtures. Despite massive infusions of Soviet arms and Cuban troops, Ethiopia becomes fragmented under the incompetent governance of the Derg, resulting in its loss of several regions to separatists, including Eritrea. The integrity of the Warsaw Pact is also threatened by restive nationalist movements, often accompanied by anti-Soviet sentiment, in Poland and even the Central Asian Soviet republics.

Politburo debate
The Politburo of the Communist Party of the Soviet Union comes to the consensus that its economy is stagnating and the armed forces may not retain technological parity with the West for much longer. The Politburo leadership believes that it would be in their best interests to invade Western Europe and decisively expand the Soviet sphere of influence. Although resistance from NATO is anticipated, the Politburo gambles on a quick and easy victory over its European member nations before the United States can effectively mobilize a counteroffensive.

Soviet officials deliberate three strategic options:

'Variant A' involves a sudden mass pre-emptive nuclear strike throughout the entire European theater, including Spain and Portugal.  The Soviet Air Force and Aeroflot would drop Spetsnaz forces into areas not under nuclear attack.
A land invasion of Western Europe would then follow intended to last seven days, stopping at a line running from Linz-Frankfurt-Dunkirk.

'Variant B' was identical to Variant A, but with chemical weapons and high explosives instead of nuclear weapons.

'Variant C' involves a conventional invasion with a nuclear strike as a backup option in the event of the invasion stalling.

The Politburo debates the nuclear option intensely.  Eventually, it was decided that any use of nuclear weapons would inevitably escalate to a full strategic exchange which would leave the Soviets so damaged as to make victory not worthwhile.  Variant C was therefore chosen, augmented with some selective chemical strikes occurring where they might prove to be most effective, with the understanding that if the advance of Warsaw Pact forces was halted by Western resistance (led by NATO), nuclear weapons could be used to regain the initiative on the battlefield.

An invasion of the western seaboard of the United States as a distraction from Western Europe was briefly considered but then dismissed as logistically implausible due to the Soviet inability to lift enough airborne divisions and the US Naval and Air Defences along the US west coast.

It was also agreed that it would be Soviet policy to discourage the European neutrals from entry into the war, especially Ireland and Sweden.
The Politburo agreed to try to convince France to stay out of the conflict, as this would help create division in NATO and thereby make a Warsaw Pact victory more likely.

The war
The catalyst for conflict comes in July 1985, when a US Marine Corps unit intervenes against a Soviet incursion into Yugoslavia. In response, the Warsaw Pact mobilizes and subsequently launches a full-scale invasion of Western Europe on 4 August 1985 (the 71st anniversary of the start of the First World War). Soviet forces thrust through West Germany towards the Rhine, and also land forces in northern Norway and Turkey. Attacks are also carried out using long-range strategic bombing, naval forces, and even killer satellites in space.

The Soviet Union had hoped that Ireland, Sweden and France would stay out of the war, as this would take some pressure off the invading Warsaw Pact forces, making victory more likely. However, Ireland, Sweden, and France eventually side with NATO, for various reasons, in both direct and indirect ways.

Ireland (having gotten around its reluctance to become a British ally by entering into a bilateral defense agreement with France which allowed France, and thus its allies, to station naval and air forces on Ireland's west coast) enters the war when the Soviet Navy (having secretly planted mines in Irish territorial waters) sinks an Irish naval vessel and the Soviet Air Force launches a missile attack on Shannon Airport—now home to various NATO aircraft including French fighter jets and various NATO submarine hunting planes such as the U.S. Navy's P-3C Orion.

The Soviet Union tries to buy Swedish neutrality with a mixture of rhetoric and veiled threats, but tensions rise as the Soviet Air Force repeatedly invades Swedish airspace to attack Norway. The Soviets believed that because Sweden had not been in a war since the 19th century, the Swedes would not retaliate, but this assumption is quickly proven false. A fierce air battle occurs when the Swedish Air Force attacks a Soviet bomber formation, and the Swedes take heavy losses before the Soviets are forced to turn back. The Swedes fully mobilize for war and contact Norway to begin cooperating on aerial defence, making Sweden a de facto co-belligerent beside NATO.

The Soviet conventional-force juggernaut quickly loses steam. Stiff resistance by NATO eventually foils the Soviet invasion, and Warsaw Pact forces get no further west (at least within West Germany) than the city of Krefeld, and no further north-west than the Netherlands, which they briefly occupy.

From mid-August, the capacity of the Soviet Union to wage war is significantly reduced by the political and military desertion of some of its demoralized allies, internal dissent at home, and mutinies within its own armed forces.

Outside Europe, the US bombs Cuba, the Chinese invade Vietnam and overthrow its government, Egypt invades Libya, Japan seizes the Kurile islands, the Frontline States and most of the Soviet Union's other African allies invade South Africa, and the Soviet Navy and its merchant fleet are both permanently neutralized.

To prove to the world that they are still a force to be reckoned with, the Soviets launch a successful nuclear missile strike against Birmingham, United Kingdom. The US Navy and Royal Navy retaliate with a joint nuclear strike on Minsk, which accelerates the collapse of Soviet control in its satellite states in the Eastern Bloc.

Angry Moscow citizens protesting over food shortages become convinced a luxury hotel for foreign guests contains hoarded food for the Soviet elite and storm the building, only to find bodies of the murdered guests. The furious crowd charges back out into the streets, growing by the minute, and the few Soviet security troops available to stop them turn on the loyalists in their ranks and join the rioters, meaning that the Soviet government rapidly loses control of anywhere in Moscow except the Kremlin. Elsewhere in the USSR, political dissidents and revolutionaries organize prison breaks, turning all manner of enemies of the state loose in the country. A coup d'etat led by Ukrainian nationalists overthrows the Soviet Politburo, consigning the Soviet Union to history.

Protagonists
Since the style of the book is as a fictional retrospective, much of it is written in a formal, historical tone. Interspersed with these sections, however, are short stories depicting various events unfolding in view of various characters. One character that does appear in a number of stories is Andrei Nekrassov, a 24-year old officer commanding a company of BMP-1 infantry fighting vehicles in the Soviet 197th Motor Rifle Division, who engages with NATO forces on various occasions, moving from a credulous young man affected by propaganda into a more cynical, harder man whose experience of war against the west has affected his belief in the Soviet system.

A new post-war world

The ruins of Birmingham and Minsk are preserved as war memorials, fronted by immense causeways. The memorials are called Peace City West and Peace City East, respectively.

German reunification, formerly a goal of both East and West Germany, is not achieved. Former belligerents from both sides of World War III are against it, and interest in and support for it has diminished considerably in both West Germany and East Germany. The two nations have come to possess separate national identities, and East Germany, having outlived the superpower that created it, begins to determine its post-war future by setting its first free and open elections for 1986.

The three new superpowers intend to develop in peace, regarding each other as peaceful friends and competitors in the economic sense, rather than as political and military rivals. The new superpowers are the European Confederation, the United States, and a similar Asian confederation dominated by Japan and China.

Alternate ending
In The Untold Story, a separate chapter is devoted to an alternative, much darker, scenario, written in the form of radio transcripts and newspaper editorials.

The alternative scenario assumes the following factors have changed from the 'real' story:
The Peace Movements in the 1950s, 1960s and 1970s have been successful in removing theater nuclear forces from Western Europe.
The United Kingdom has scrapped its nuclear missile submarines, abandoning Polaris and refusing to proceed with Trident.
The only nuclear forces on the NATO side are the French SLBMs and the US ICBMs based in the contiguous United States.
Public pressure, led by the peace movements, prevented a compensatory increase in spending on conventional forces as nuclear forces were reduced, which increased NATO's existing disadvantage in conventional forces. (This disadvantage had previously been lessened by the theater nuclear forces).

In assessing these factors, the Soviets believe that NATO is not prepared to aggressively defend Western Europe, and so they prepare invasion plans. Given the political repression and lack of freedom of speech in the Soviet Union, the government has not had to deal with demands from peace movements to reduce its forces. It has a high level of capability compared to the waning preparedness of Western forces.

The Soviets begin invasion of Western Europe, quickly overrunning NATO conventional forces in the Low Countries and soon reaching the French border. Driven by their fear of a Soviet occupation, or a punitive bombing campaign if they refuse to comply, France withdraws from the conflict after the Soviet Union assures them that if they do so, they will escape occupation and attack.

Deciding not to risk global nuclear war by using US ICBMs to attack the Soviet positions in Western Europe, the UK and US leaderships sue for peace. All US forces are withdrawn from Europe.

Although not occupied by enemy forces, the UK is forced to accept a set of conditions that allows the Soviet Union effectively to control its military, economic, and political institutions. The UK's European Community membership is terminated, as are her obligations to the Treaty of Rome. A journalist predicts the Soviets will terminate trade union immunities under the law. A joint UK-Soviet Commission will control the country.

The Queen stays in the UK, but the major members of the Royal family are sent to various Commonwealth states.  Major parts of the Royal Air Force and Royal Navy escape Soviet control by putting themselves under US, Canadian or Australian commands.

This chapter is not included in the Macmillan edition.

Development 
Only a portion of the book was actually written by Hackett.

Literary goals
Hackett had two objectives in mind: to demonstrate the necessity for Western Europe to have a strong and coordinated conventional military, and to suggest that the use of nuclear weapons might not result in full nuclear warfare between the Soviets and the West. The limited use of nuclear weapons portrayed in this scenario results after one side's conventional forces have become weak and vulnerable (the Soviets). The other side responds quickly, albeit with a limited NATO retaliation, implemented simultaneously by the UK and the US.

Critical response
Christopher Lehmann-Haupt of The New York Times thought that Hackett's proposed scenarios were too optimistic. Points that Lehmann-Haupt questioned included the portrayal of the Soviets as not initiating a major nuclear exchange (and thereby a global nuclear war) as they near defeat, and projecting Western forces proceeding without critical setbacks caused by poor decisions or bad luck. The effects of the war and enlightened policies resolve many local conflicts, from Ireland, to Central America, and in Palestine. Lehmann-Haupt criticized the novel for being too dry and swift in moving through its major incidents. But, noting that Hackett had consulted with many military and political experts, Lehmann-Haupt said that the book represented a "very high order of strategic thinking" and "a signal to the Soviets, or even a warning, of the way some Western military leaders are thinking."

Release details
1982, UK, Sidgwick & Jackson, Pub date ? ? 1982, hardback (First edition)
1982, US, Macmillan, Pub date ? ? 1982, hardback
1983, US, Bantam Books, Pub date ? ? 1983, paperback
1983, US, New English Library,, Pub date 1 July 1983, hardback

See also
Team Yankee, a 1987 novel by Harold Coyle set in Hackett's scenario.
Future War 198X, a Japanese anime war film partially based on Hackett's novel.
Red Army, by Ralph Peters, showing a Soviet invasion of Western Europe from an entirely Soviet perspective.
Red Storm Rising, a similar World War III scenario by Tom Clancy, covering a conventional Soviet invasion of Western Europe

References

1982 British novels
Novels set during World War III
Alternate history novels
South African Border War in popular culture
Fiction set in 1984
Fiction set in 1985
Sidgwick & Jackson books